Bharat Heavy Electrical Ltd Sports Complex or BHEL Stadium is a multi purpose stadium in Bhopal, Madhya Pradesh, India. The ground is mainly used for organizing matches of football, cricket and other sports.

The stadium hosted four first-class matches  from 1987 when Madhya Pradesh cricket team played against Rajasthan cricket team. until 1994.

The stadium hosted four List A matches  from 1994 when Madhya Pradesh cricket team played against Rajasthan cricket team.  but since then the stadium has hosted non first-class cricket matches.

References

External links 

 cricketarchive
 cricinfo
 Official Website

Sports venues in Bhopal
Cricket grounds in Madhya Pradesh
Football venues in Madhya Pradesh
1987 establishments in Madhya Pradesh
Sports venues completed in 1987
20th-century architecture in India